William Clyde Fitch (May 2, 1865 – September 4, 1909) was an American dramatist, the most popular writer for the Broadway stage of his time (c. 1890–1909).

Biography
Born in Elmira, New York, and educated at Holderness School and Amherst College (class of 1886), William Clyde Fitch wrote over 60 plays, 36 of them original, ranging from social comedies and farces to melodrama and historical dramas.

His father, Captain William G. Fitch, a graduate of West Point and Union officer in the Civil War, encouraged his son to become an architect or to engage in a career of business; but his mother, Alice Clark, in whose eyes he could do no wrong, always believed in his artistic talent. (For her son's final resting place, she hired the architectural firm of Hunt & Hunt to design the sarcophagus set inside an open Tuscan temple at Woodlawn Cemetery in the Bronx.) Fitch graduated from Amherst in 1886, where he was a member of Chi Psi fraternity. As an undergraduate, "he dazzled his fellow students with his flair for dress and his virtuosity as an amateur actor."

Fitch was one of the early American playwrights to publish his plays. His first work of note was Beau Brummell (1890), set in the English Regency and based on the life of the historical figure. The play became a lucrative showcase for actor Richard Mansfield (1857–1907), who played the title role for the rest of his life. His 1892 play Masked Ball (an adaption from Alexandre Bisson's Le Veglione) was the first time that producer Charles Frohman put Maude Adams with John Drew Jr., a pairing that led to many successes. In 1901, Captain Jinks of the Horse Marines made a star of Ethel Barrymore. "Fitch had a special talent for writing female characters that female stars could act agreeably," theater critic and historian Brooks Atkinson wrote of him in his history of Broadway.

Fitch was renowned in his time for works such as Nathan Hale (1898), The Climbers (1901), The Girl with the Green Eyes (which ran 108 performances at the Savoy Theatre in 1902 and starred Robert Drouet as John Austin), The Woman in the Case (which starred Drouet and ran for 89 performances at the Herald Square Theatre in 1905),The Truth (1907), The City (1909), and Girls (1910). His works were popular on both sides of the Atlantic. His play based on the heroine of John Greenleaf Whittier's poem Barbara Frietchie met with mixed reviews in 1899 because of the romance he added to the tale, but it was revived successfully many times. In 1896, he wrote the lyrics to a popular song Love Makes The World Go 'Round, with an arrangement by William Furst.

In December 1905, Fitch visited novelist Edith Wharton in her Park Avenue apartment to discuss collaborating on a dramatization of her novel The House of Mirth. Wharton was not a fan of Fitch's plays, which she regarded as more commercial than artistic, but knew him to be a consummate professional and the most likely writer to be able to bring Lily Bart's story to the stage. She also enjoyed his ironic sense of humor. (Wharton described her visitor as "a plump showily dressed little man, with his olive complexion and his beautiful Oriental eyes full of wit and understanding.") In the following months, they met in Paris and at the Mount, Wharton's estate in Massachusetts, to work on drafts, with Wharton taking responsibility for the dialogue and Fitch for the plot revisions. At one point, when the work was not going well, Wharton in frustration asked Fitch why he had ever thought her novel could be turned into a successful play. Incredulous, Fitch replied that he never had thought that it was a plausible endeavor. It then became clear, to their amusement, that each had been set up (probably by producer Charles Frohman) to believe that the project had been initiated by the other, and seduced by the thought of working with a famous person in another field, they had each agreed to collaborate. The play was the critical and commercial failure Wharton feared it would be, but the two became good friends.

Fitch's career spanned a brief two decades, but he earned upwards of $250,000 from his plays at a time when a dollar per day was the working wage. He directed a few of his plays and was involved in the production of all of them. He was the first American playwright to be taken seriously, and at one time, managed to have five plays running simultaneously on Broadway. "Once Clyde Fitch got his foot in the door," Brooks Atkinson wrote. "He dominated Broadway drama."

A generous host with an engaging personality, Fitch was renowned as a raconteur. His invitations to Quiet Corner, his estate in Greenwich, Connecticut, were much sought-after. He was a close friend of designer Elsie de Wolfe, who helped him find many of the furnishings for his Connecticut mansion, Manhattan townhouse, and other residences. At one point, she said "He knows more about women than most women know about themselves." About his taste for luxury and his work habits, a friend remarked "He lives like sultan and works like a dock laborer on an eighteen-hour shift."

A dandy by his early teens, Fitch knew that in school he was seen as a sissy, but he said "I would rather be misunderstood than lose my independence." Correspondence of the time points to a likely relationship, however brief, with Oscar Wilde. James Gibbons Huneker, a critic sympathetic to Fitch's wit and sense of the ironic, dropped a few broad hints about the playwright's sexuality in his columns when commenting on his "feminine manner of apprehending meanings of life," his not always believably masculine dialogue, and his reserve when dealing with passion between men and women. Huneker also wrote that, if Fitch slowed down and lived long enough, he might actually turn out a "masterpiece in miniature."

Fitch suffered from attacks of appendicitis but refused his American doctor's recommendation of surgery; instead he trusted the specialists in Europe who assured him that they could effect a cure over time without surgery. He left for Europe in Spring 1909 against his doctor's wishes.

While staying at the Hotel de la Haute Mère de Dieu at Châlons-en-Champagne in France, he suffered what would be a fatal attack. He underwent surgery by a local doctor rather than travel to Paris and died from blood poisoning aged 44. His body was returned from France where it was entombed for a time in the Swan Callendar Mausoleum at Woodlawn Cemetery in The Bronx, which belonged to a friend.

In 1910, the body was removed and taken to New Jersey for cremation, and the ashes were returned to the Swan Callendar Mausoleum until the Hunt & Hunt monument was finished. His ashes were placed in a sarcophagus (where his parents' ashes later joined his) in their own mausoleum in Woodlawn Cemetery. A memorial exists at the Clyde Fitch Memorial Room in Converse Hall at Amherst.

Since his death, Fitch has fallen into obscurity, but some of his plays were revived in repertory theaters in the twentieth century or made into films and adapted for television. The Archives and Special Collections at Amherst College holds a collection of his papers.

Miscellany
 Barbara Stanwyck took her name from a combination of the name of his play Barbara Frietchie and its star, the British actress Joan Stanwyck.
 His name comes up in the 1950 film All About Eve when Margo Channing (played by Bette Davis) states that Fitch was "well before my time."
 Silent film adaptations of Fitch's work include Girls, The City (1916), The City (1926), Lovers' Lane, and Barbara Frietchie. All are presumed lost. A more complete list of films based on Fitch's work can be found at the AFI Film Catalogue. His play Beau Brummel has been adapted at least twice, once in 1924 with John Barrymore in the title role, and again in 1954 under the title Beau Brummell starring Stewart Granger and Elizabeth Taylor.

References

Sources
Atkinson, Brooks. Broadway. New York: Atheneum, 1970.
Moses, Montrose, J. The American Dramatist. Boston: Little, Brown, 1911.
Winter, William. The Wallet of Time, Vol. I & II. New York: Moffat, Yard, & Co., 1913.

External links 

 W. Clyde Fitch (AC 1886) Collection at Amherst College Archives & Special Collections
 
 
 
 
 
Theater Arts Manuscripts: An Inventory of the Collection at the Harry Ransom Center
 Encyclopædia Britannica
 "Who Was Clyde Fitch?" at The Clyde Fitch Report
Clyde Fitch typescripts and letters, circa 1890-1925 held by University of Pennsylvania: Kislak Center for Special Collections, Rare Books and Manuscripts

1865 births
1909 deaths
Songwriters from New York (state)
Writers from Greenwich, Connecticut
Writers from Elmira, New York
Amherst College alumni
Burials at Woodlawn Cemetery (Bronx, New York)
Deaths from sepsis
American LGBT dramatists and playwrights
19th-century American dramatists and playwrights
20th-century American dramatists and playwrights